Homogenes leprieurii is a species of beetle in the family Cerambycidae. It was described by Buquet in 1844.

References

Heteropsini
Beetles described in 1844